Briles is a surname. Notable people with the name include:

Art Briles (born 1955), American football player and coach
Herschel F. Briles (1914–1994), US Army soldier
James E. Briles (1926–1992), American politician
Judith Briles, American author
Kendal Briles (born 1982), American football player and coach
Nelson Briles (1943–2005), American baseball player